William Taylor Cope (December 25, 1836 – November 26, 1902) was a Republican politician in the state of Ohio and was Ohio State Treasurer from 1892 to 1896.

William T. Cope was born in 1836 at Columbiana County, Ohio, and in his earlier years was a coal operator or merchant. During the American Civil War he was a captain in the 143rd Volunteer Infantry. He represented his county in the Ohio House of Representatives, winning elections in 1885 and 1887 to the 67th and 68th General Assemblies.

Cope then moved to Cleveland, Ohio, where he was a wholesale coal dealer. In 1891 and again in 1893, he was elected State Treasurer. Later he worked for a bank in Columbus. He died November 26, 1902, and is interred at Green Lawn Cemetery, Columbus, Ohio

Notes

References
 
 

State treasurers of Ohio
People from Columbiana County, Ohio
Republican Party members of the Ohio House of Representatives
People of Ohio in the American Civil War
1836 births
1902 deaths
Burials at Green Lawn Cemetery (Columbus, Ohio)
19th-century American politicians